Assault Heroes 2  is the sequel to Assault Heroes, an arcade-style, top-down shooter video game developed by Chilean Wanako Games. The game was released on May 14, 2008.

Gameplay

The core gameplay remains the same as the first Assault Heroes, but the player now has the ability to hijack enemy units, allowing players to man such vehicles as tanks and helicopters. The game also features above and underground on-foot only areas, with larger maps than the previous game's on-foot underground lairs.

Multiplayer
The game still supports two player co-op multiplayer both on- and off-line, and teammates may now link weapons for increased damage.

Reception

GameSpot's Tom McShea scored the game a 7.5/10 saying: "Despite the lack of innovation, this is one of the best shooters on the service, an eminently enjoyable old-school romp". IGN awarded the game an 8.5/10: "One of the best shooters on XBLA has returned" and "Assault Heroes 2 is a great game for Xbox Live Arcade, especially if you've never played through the original. It changes and improves elements from the original while still holding onto what everyone loved about the first game".

References

External links
Xbox page: Assault Heroes 2 Xbox 360, Xbox One

2008 video games
Cooperative video games
Shoot 'em ups
Sierra Entertainment games
Xbox 360 Live Arcade games
Xbox 360-only games
Xbox 360 games
Video games developed in Chile